Francesco Manca (born November 1966, in Milan, Italy) is an Italian amateur astronomer and discoverer of minor planets at the Sormano Astronomical Observatory in northern Italy.

Manca also performs follow-up astrometry of near-Earth objects (NEOs). He acquired research and observational experience on the NEOs at professional observatories in Arizona, United States at Catalina Sky Survey (IAU Obs code 703 and G96) Non-observational work focuses on computations of orbit and close approaches of asteroids with the Earth (linked at Center for Near Earth Object Studies (CNEOS) -  Jet Propulsion Laboratory) and computation of orbit  identifications of asteroids (Near Earth Asteroids, Mars-crossing asteroids , Hungaria group, Trans-Neptunian object) and comets.

He wrote many articles on specialistic magazines. Member of SIMCA and associated (INAF) National Institute for Astrophysics. His professional activity concerns the application of measuring systems as encoders for Right Ascension and Declination (azimuth and elevation), installed on telescopes and Radio telescopes such as the VLT, LBT, ELT (Extremely Large Telescope), ALMA (Atacama Large Millimeter Array), DAG (Turkish for Eastern Anatolia Observatory), ASTRI (Astrophysics with mirrors at Italian Replicant Technology) and NEOSTEL (FlyEye telescope) for ESA or on space instruments as Solar Monitoring Observatory.

The Koronian asteroid 15460 Manca, discovered by Andrea Boattini and Luciano Tesi at San Marcello Pistoiese Observatory in 1998, is named in his honour.

List of discovered minor planets

See also 
 Augusto Testa
 Marco Cavagna
 Graziano Ventre
 Pierangelo Ghezzi
 Piero Sicoli
 Valter Giuliani

Publications 
 "Asteroid and Planet Close Encounters", Minor Planet Bulletin, ( 1999 F. Manca, P. Sicoli ) 
 "Monitoring Hazardous Objects", Proceedings of the Third Italian Meeting of Planetary Science, ( 2000 F. Manca, P. Sicoli ) 
 "Planetary Close Encounters", Proceedings of the Fourth Italian Meeting of Planetary Science, ( 2002 F. Manca, P. Sicoli ) 
 "Minor planet recovery: analysis and verification of data obtained by OrbFit and Edipo software", Proceedings of the Fifth Italian Meeting of Planetary Science, ( 2003 F. Manca, A. Testa, M. Carpino)
 "Identification of asteroids and comets: methods and results", Proceedings of the X National Conference on Planetary Science. (2011 F. Manca, P. Sicoli, and A. Testa)
 "Identification of asteroids and comets: update on methods and results".  Proceedings of the XI National Conference on Planetary Science. (2013 F. Manca, A. Testa)
 "Close encounters among asteroids, comets, Earth-Moon system and inner planets: the cases of (99942) Apophis and Comet C/2013 A1 ". Proceedings of the XII Italian national workshop of planetary sciences. (2015 F. Manca, P. Sicoli, A. Testa)
 "(WMT)  Wide-field Mufara Telescope", Presentation at XIV Italian Meeting of Planetary Science, ( 2018 F. Manca, M. Di Martino )
Publication excerpt from ADS (The SAO/NASA Astrophysics Data System)

MPECs, CBETs and IAUCs 

  COMET P/2009 W1 (Hill)
  COMET P/2009 W1 (Hill)
  NEA 1996 FR3
  PHA 1990 UA = 2009 FJ44
  PHA 2005 GY8 = 2008 FG5
  PHA 1998 WB2 = 2010 GJ7
  NEA 2001 QN142 = 2012 HP2
  NEA 2005 CZ6 = 2012 SO30
  NEA 2007 UZ1 = 2012 TC53
  NEA 2010 JN33 = 2012 TU78
  PHA 1999 VR6 = 2012 UV68
  PHA 2001 TA2 = 2013 FH
  NEA 2008 HJ3 = 2013 JV22
  NEA 2010 VD1 = 2013 TZ68
  NEA 1998 WP7 = 2013 WS45
  NEA 1995 CR = 2014 CL13
  NEA 2007 VE3 = 2014 HL132
  NEA 2011 ME = 2014 KU86
  NEA 2011 OK5 = 2014 MS41
  NEA 2010 ST16 = 2014 OT392
  NEA 2005 SY25 = 2014 SA324
  NEA 2007 TF15 = 2014 SK304
  NEA 2014 UC115 = 2014 WN7
  PHA 2009 VZ = 2014 WA363
  NEA 2003 YE13 = 2014 WW365
  NEA 2008 HA2 = 2015 DB54
  NEA 2007 EF88 = 2015 ES
  NEA 2000 AH205 = 2015 HS9
  COMET P/2004 R1 = 2015 HC10 (McNaught)
  COMET P/2015 HC_10 = P/2004 R1 (McNAUGHT)
  NEA 2015 FO124 = 2015 DP224
  NEA 2001 QJ96 = 2015 PK229
  TRANS NEPTUNIAN OBJECT 2014 UM33 = 2010 TQ182
  NEA 2000 SM10 = 2015 RF2
  NEA 2010 VU198 = 2015 XR129
  NEA 2012 XT111 = 2015 XQ169
  NEA 2002 LE31 = 2016 AJ131
  NEA 2005 EQ95 = 2016 EB28
  NEA 2005 SC = 2016 EH56
  NEA 2010 MH1 = 2016 NZ
  NEA 2009 SY = 2016 RX33
  NEA 2005 CE41 = 2016 TA19
  NEA 2010 XN = 2016 XX17
  NEA 2006 WY3 = 2017 WO
  PHA 2009 EV = 2017 YQ4
  NEA 2003 UO12 = 2018 AX11
  NEA 2018 EO1 = 2013 LG7
  NEA 2001 SC170 = 2018 HP1
 NEA 1998 UM1 = 2018 RP4
  TRANS NEPTUNIAN OBJECT 1997 GA45 = 2001 FH193
  NEA 2018 VX1 = 2018 VA6
  NEA 2007 HW4 = 2019 AE5
  PHA 2012 OP4 = 2019 BR4
  NEA 2002 CC26 = 2019 CM1
  NEA 2014 HC177 = 2019 HU3
  NEA 2008 CR116 = 2019 RN1
  NEA 2015 FJ35 = 2019 TQ1
  PHA 1998 US18 = 2019 VC1
  NEA 2019 UG7 = 2019 WP
  NEA 2020 BC15 = 2007 CP5
  NEA 2013 JS7 = 2020 HG1
  NEA 2005 FK = 2020 OU4
  NEA 1998 WA2 = 2020 PE
  NEA 1998 VD32 = 2020 SS7
  NEA 2001 GP2 = 2020 UJ7
  PHA 2003 WP21 = 2020 VO6
  NEA 2020 QM = 2019 RM4 
  NEA 2019 YH4 = 2010 CP199
  NEA 2015 OO = 2010 CR247 
  NEA 2017 GQ5 = 2010 JY209
  PHA 2010 KD149 = 2010 PW58
  PHA 2010 FF10 = 2021 ES5
  NEA 2010 LE152 = 2020 XY3
  NEA 2021 HY9 = 2021 HW2
  NEA 2010 NT81 = 2016 FZ14
  NEA 2001 RX47 = 2021 LO1
  PHA 2019 WW4 = 2010 BF135
  NEA 2010 FY103 = 2021 AS7
  NEA 2006 TO = 2021 TQ
  NEA 2007 VD138 = 2021 SO5
  NEA 2001 KY18 = 2021 VD5
  PHA 2010 BV132 = 2021 MB2
  PHA 2011 AT26 = 2022 AN3
  NEA 2010 CN233 = 2010 BO127 = 2010 BH149 = 2010 BF150
  NEA 2010 GT21 = 2021 VE10
  NEA 2010 HW81 = 2022 BD3
  NEA 2019 AG3 = 2010 KC138
  NEA 2022 OU1 = 2010 BT71

References

External links 
 Sormano Astronomical Observatory - Osservatorio Astronomico Sormano
 Computation list of orbits identification
 TECA - Table of Asteroids Next Closest Approaches to the Earth
 TAM - Table of Asteroids Next Closest Approaches to the Moon
 APEC - Interesting Asteroids Past Earth Close encounters
 Internal reports, scientific papers and broadcast interview at Sormano Observatory
  JPL - Near Earth Object Program
  Minor Planet Center
 Catalina Sky Survey
 NEODys
 The Planetary Society
 SIMCA
  ADS company Telescope Projects
 EIE Group Telescope Projects
 NEOSTEL (FlyEye) Telescope for ESA
 Officina Stellare, Ground based telescopes and Space applications
 FlyEye mount and telescope
 Advanced Telescopes
  interview in Public media RaiNews24 (2012 DA14&Russia event 2013 and more on asteroids in italian)

1966 births
Discoverers of asteroids

20th-century Italian astronomers
Living people
Planetary scientists